The Kitchener bun is a type of sweet pastry made and sold in South Australia since 1915. It consists of a bun sometimes baked, sometimes fried, made from a sweet yeasted dough similar to that used for making doughnuts, split and then filled with raspberry or strawberry jam and cream, most often with a dusting of sugar on the top.

The Kitchener bun resembles the Berliner, a pastry of German origin – although distinguished from it by an open face and the use of more cream than jam – and was, in fact, known as such until anti-German sentiment in World War I led to its renaming in honour of the British field marshal Lord Kitchener.

In a 1930 recipe the jam is sealed into the pastry before deep-frying in fat, and there is no mention of cream until 1934. Ten years later, an Unley Road baker was fined £15 2 (around $1000) for using cream in his Kitchener buns, contrary to provisions in the National Security Regulations.

See also
 List of Australian place names changed from German names

References

External links
Recent Kitchener bun recipe

Australian cuisine
Culture of South Australia
Pastries
Australian desserts
Sweet breads
Buns
Doughnuts